The Río ícán is a river in Southwest Guatemala. Its sources are in the Sierra Madre range, on the slopes of the Santo Tomás volcano in the department of Suchitepéquez. It flows southwards through the coastal lowlands of Suchitepequez to the Pacific Ocean.

The river runs more or less parallel to its main tributary, the Sís River.

See also
List of rivers of Guatemala

References

Rivers of Guatemala